Infantry is the professional journal of the U.S. Army soldier, published by the United States Army Infantry School at Fort Benning, Georgia. Following the success of ARMOR magazine (first published 1888), Infantry was launched in 1904 as the Journal of the U.S. Infantry Association, and has variously held the names Infantry Journal, Mailing List (Infantry School), and Infantry School Quarterly, before settling on the current name and format in 1959.

See also
 Field Artillery

References

External links

Quarterly magazines published in the United States
Magazines established in 1904
Magazines published in Georgia (U.S. state)
Military magazines published in the United States